is a Japanese unisex name. Notable people with the name include:

Hikari Hirata (born 1995), Japanese professional footballer 
, Japanese actress
, Japanese actress
, Japanese professional wrestler
, Japanese actress
, Japanese professional footballer
, Japanese football player
, Japanese professional wrestler
, Japanese voice actress
, Japanese women's footballer
, Japanese composer
, Japanese motorcycle racer
, Japanese television comedian
, Japanese model, singer, and television personality
, Japanese professional wrestler
,  Japanese judoka

Fictional characters
Hikari Sakishima, a character in Nagi-Asu: A Lull in the Sea
, a character in the Pokémon: Diamond & Pearl video game and anime series
Hikari Asahina (樋香里), a minor character in Magical Girl Pretty Sammy
Hikari Kamijo (洞木 ヒカリ), the main character in the anime series Hikari no Densetsu (lit. Legend of Light)
Hikari Horaki, a character in Neon Genesis Evangelion
Hikari Kamiya (八神 ヒカリ), a character in Digimon Adventure, Digimon Adventure 02 and Digimon Adventure Tri
Hikari, a character in This Ugly Yet Beautiful World
Hikari Hayashi, a character in the manga Full Moon o Sagashite
Hikari Konohana, a character in the anime Strawberry Panic!
Hikari Kuroda, a character in School Days
Lan Hikari (Netto Hikari), Yuichiro Hikari, and Haruka Hikari, characters in the Mega Man Battle Network and MegaMan NT Warrior series
Satoshi Hikari and Rio Hikari, characters in D.N.Angel
Ultraman Hikari, a character in Ultraman Mebius
Hikari Kujou, a character in Futari wa Pretty Cure
Hikari Hanazono, a character in S · A: Special A
Natsumi Hikari, a character in Kamen Rider Decade
Hikari, a character in Haibane Renmei
Hikari Nonomura, a character in Ressha Sentai ToQger
Hikari Madoka, a character in Ultraman
Hikari, a character in Arcaea
Hikari Takanashi, a character in Interviews with Monster Girls
Hikari Kagura, a character in the Revue Starlight franchise

See also
Hikaru

Japanese-language surnames
Japanese unisex given names